Harshana Godamanna (born 31 October 1985) is a Sri Lankan tennis player. Godamanna has regularly represented Sri Lanka in the Davis Cup since making his debut in 2002 against Jordan. As of 2016, he currently holds the record for the most singles victories by any Sri Lankan player in Davis Cup history, twice leading the team to the Asia/Oceania Group II during his career.

Outside of the Davis Cup, Godamanna has also won an ITF doubles title, partnering with Bart Govaerts to win a 2007 Futures event in Pakistan.

References

External links
 
 
 

Sri Lankan male tennis players
Sri Lankan sportspeople
1985 births
Living people
Sinhalese sportspeople
Tennis players at the 2010 Commonwealth Games
Tennis players at the 2006 Asian Games
Tennis players at the 2010 Asian Games
Asian Games competitors for Sri Lanka
Commonwealth Games competitors for Sri Lanka
South Asian Games bronze medalists for Sri Lanka
South Asian Games medalists in tennis
20th-century Sri Lankan people
21st-century Sri Lankan people